The National Center for Contemporary Art (NCCA) in Moscow, Russia, is a museum, exhibition and research organization which primarily aims its efforts at the development of Contemporary Russian Art within the context of the global art process, at the creation and implementation of programs and projects in the sphere of contemporary art, architecture and design both in Russia and beyond its borders.  The activity of the Center evolves in close cooperation with artists and independent experts in the sphere of contemporary art, art culture and various organizations, such as museums, research institutions, public organizations, both in Russia, and abroad.

The activities of the National Center of Contemporary Art follow several basic lines:

popularization and support of Contemporary Russian Art;
various forms of curator work helping realize exhibition and audiovisual projects, installations, performances, hold video and movie presentations, creative sessions;
analytical and information research activity in the sphere of contemporary art;
educational activities – lectures, seminars, master classes;
work to form the collection of contemporary art, including Russian and foreign art.

Today, when the efforts of the previous years are bringing fruit, the National Center for Contemporary Art continues its active work aimed at the development and popularization of the Russian contemporary art and its integration in the global art context. At present NCCA is a network institution with its branches in major cultural centers of Russia, such as St. Petersburg, Nizhny Novgorod, Yekaterinburg and Kaliningrad.

The National Center for Contemporary Art works under the auspices and with the constant support of the Ministry of Culture of the Russian Federation and The Federal Agency for Culture and Cinematography.

External links and source
Official site of NCCA

See also

List of Moscow tourist attractions#Museums
Tretyakov Gallery
Moscow Museum of Modern Art
Moscow House of Photography

Art museums and galleries in Moscow